= Graysville, Virginia =

Unincorporated community in Virginia, United States

Coordinates: 37°42′48″N 75°40′44″W

Graysville is an unincorporated community in Accomack County, Virginia, United States.
